Pradell de la Teixeta is a small village in Catalonia, Spain, located in the comarca of Priorat, in the province of Tarragona. In 2005 the population was approximately 189.

References

External links 
 
 Government data pages 

Municipalities in Priorat
Populated places in Priorat